is a Japanese footballer currently playing as a left-back for Omiya Ardija as a designated special player. He is the brother of fellow footballer Fumiya Suzuki.

Career statistics

Club
.

Notes

References

External links

2000 births
Living people
Waseda University alumni
Japanese footballers
Association football defenders
J3 League players
FC Tokyo players
Omiya Ardija players